"Giving In" is the first single from American rock band Adema's self-titled debut album. The song appeared on Now 9, as well as on a commercial for AT&T Mobility it is one of the band's most popular and well known songs.

Music video 
The music video for "Giving In" (directed by Paul Fedor) features the band playing on what appears to be an outdoor rooftop under a dark sky, moving as if on a conveyor belt, while lead singer Mark Chavez moves through different rooms. The rooms and scenarios that are shown while the band are playing include a hotel room with a couple, a little girl sitting on a rocking chair watching a violent movie, and a woman in a glass tank. As the video progresses, certain changes take place. People who are apparently either invisible or are meant to be there stand around the bed watching the couple have sex. A car crash takes place behind the little girl, and a man starts kissing the woman in the tank that has now been filled up with water.

Track listing 
Maxi CD single
1. "Giving In" (Radio Edit)
2. "Shattered"
3. "Blow It Away" (Demo)
4. "Giving In" (Video)

Import CDS
1. "Giving In" (Radio Edit)
2. "Shattered"
3. "Everyone" (Demo)
4. "Blow It Away" (Demo)

Radio CD
1. "Giving In" (Radio Edit) - 3:55
2. "Giving In" (Album Version) - 4:35

Giving In / Do What You Want To Do Promo CD
1. "Giving In" - 4:35
2. "Do What You Want To" - 3:01

References

2001 songs
2001 singles
Adema songs
Arista Records singles